Aghuzbon (also Romanized as Āghūzbon, Aghoozbon, Āghowzbon; also known as Aguzban and Āqhūzbon) is a village in Kalashtar Rural District, in the Central District of Rudbar County, Gilan Province, Iran. At the 2006 census, its population was 103, in 43 families.

References 

Populated places in Rudbar County